"Nothin' (That Compares 2 U)" is the first single released from The Jacksons' album 2300 Jackson Street. The song was co-written by L. A. Reid and Babyface. "Nothin' (That Compares 2 U)" is considered one of The Jacksons' last successful singles before the group's breakup, peaking at #4 on the US Billboard R&B Singles chart. It became the group's last Top 40 hit in Britain, peaking at #33 on the UK Charts. This would be their only hit song to date, without Michael Jackson. A music video was produced to promote the single.

Mixes
Album version (5:22)
7" edit (4:13)
Extended version (7:42)
Sensitive Vocal Mix (6:00)
The Mix (7:05)
Choice Dub (5:50)
Bass World Dub (5:50)

Personnel
Jermaine Jackson, Steven Randall Jackson: Lead Vocals
The Jacksons: Background Vocals
L.A. Reid: Drums, Percussions
Babyface: Keyboards, Electric Bass, Guitar, Soloist
Donald K. Parks: Synthesizer [Fairlight CMI]

Chart performance

References

1989 songs
1989 singles
The Jackson 5 songs
Songs written by L.A. Reid
Song recordings produced by Babyface (musician)
Songs written by Babyface (musician)
Epic Records singles